Handy is an unincorporated community in Coweta County, Georgia, United States, located  west of Newnan.

References

Unincorporated communities in Coweta County, Georgia
Unincorporated communities in Georgia (U.S. state)